Helme Heine (born 4 April 1941 in Berlin) is a best-selling German writer, children's book author, illustrator and designer. He currently lives in New Zealand, writing screenplays, audiobook scripts and creating satirical drawings and sculptures.

Biography
Helme (Helmut) Heine was born in Berlin in 1941. His parents ran different restaurants and hotels. Helme Heine is the brother of author and architect Ernst Wilhelm Heine. Among other places, he spent his childhood in Lübbecke and from 1953 in Wülfrath. When he graduated from high school in 1958, he had attended thirteen schools. As a student, he was characterised as "playful, non-conformist and with a broad artistic talent". He went on to study business and art.

Afterwards, in the early 1960s, although planned, he did not take over the parental hotel in a moated castle in Wülfrath-Düssel, an old, small village at the town boundary to Wuppertal. Instead he traveled through Europe, Asia, and South Africa, where he settled down and worked in Johannesburg until 1977. He created a political and literary cabaret called "Sauerkraut", ran a satirical magazine, drew and worked as a director, stage designer and actor. At the beginning of the 1970s, Heine started painting.

In 1975, Helme Heine created his first children's book, "The secret of the elephant's poohs". In the same year, he met with editor Gertraud Middelhauve on the Frankfurt Book Fair, who published the book in 1976. It won an honourable mention for the "Premio Grafico" of the Bologna Children's Book Fair. The first major success followed in 1977 with "The Pigs' Wedding".

In 1977, Helme Heine pulled up stakes in South-Africa and returned to Germany with his family. He has since published over 50 children's books which have been translated to over 35 languages. Two of them were featured in the New York Times' "Best Illustrated Children's Books of the Year": "Mr. Miller the Dog" (1980) and "The Marvelous Journey through the Night" (1991). His most famous work is "Friends" from 1982.

Helme Heine has done theater and musical work in different locations, including the 1970 World's Fair in Osaka. He has created a theme park for the Hanover Zoo and has had numerous expositions in Europe, the United States and Asia. In 1983, Heine created another popular children's character in the form of a little green dragon called "Tabaluga" together with Peter Maffay and Gregor Rottschalk. Different "Tabaluga" musicals have toured Germany with great success and an en-suite production was played at Metronom Theater in Oberhausen in 1999. The Tabaluga cartoon series ran for 78 episodes and aired in 18 countries. "Sauerkraut" became the name of a children's cartoon series Heine created in 1992.

In the late 1980s, Helme Heine traveled to Ireland and went on to New Zealand. Today, he lives and works in Russell in the Bay of Islands together with his wife, author Gisela von Radowitz. Heine writes novels for adults, radio and film scripts such as the film "Mollywoop" (2009), he draws and paints and designs sculptures and furniture. In his free time, Heine enjoys sailing and fishing.

Helme Heine supports the "Stiftung Freunde" ("Friends Foundation"), a charity run by Rotary clubs in Bavaria, Saxony and Austria, named after his most famous book. The foundation is aimed at teaching life skills to young children and preventing violence and addictions.

As an author and illustrator, Helme Heine has won numerous national and international prizes, including the European children's book award.

Bibliography

Children's books (selection)
 Saturday in Paradise
 The Secret of the Elephant's Poohs 
 Prince Bear
 Friends 
 King Hop the First
 The Most Beautiful Egg in the World 
 The Pigs' Wedding
 Mollywoop 
 Tabaluga
 The Hare With the Red Nose 
 The Club 
 Foxtrot 
 Friends Go Adventuring 
 The Pearl

Books on Helme Heine and his works 
 Karola Kimmerle: Die Freunde von Helme Heine. Ridinghaus (2001). 
 Maren Saam: Literatur-Werkstatt zum Kinderbuch von Helme Heine "Freunde". Verlag an der Ruhr (2004). 
 Gisela von Radowitz: Traum und Wirklichkeit – Helme Heine, ein Portrait. Beltz & Gelberg (2012).

References

External links 
 Website

1941 births
Living people
Writers from Berlin
German children's writers
German male writers